Tomashhorod is an urban-type settlement in Sarny Raion (district) of Rivne Oblast (province) in western Ukraine. Its population was 2,535 as of the 2001 Ukrainian Census. Current population:

History
Tomashhorod was first founded in 1800 and it acquired the status of an urban-type settlement in 1960.

References

Urban-type settlements in Sarny Raion
Wołyń Voivodeship (1921–1939)
Populated places established in 1800